Pitcairnia elliptica is a species of plant in the family Bromeliaceae. It is endemic to Ecuador.  Its natural habitats are subtropical or tropical moist lowland forests and subtropical or tropical moist montane forests. It is threatened by habitat loss.

References

elliptica
Endemic flora of Ecuador
Critically endangered flora of South America
Taxonomy articles created by Polbot